Boris Becker and Guy Forget were the defending champions, but Becker did not participate this year.  Forget partnered Henri Leconte.

Jim Courier and Javier Sánchez won the title, defeating Forget and Leconte 7–6, 3–6, 6–3 in the final.

Seeds

Draw

Finals

Top half

Bottom half

References
 Doubles Draw

Newsweek Champions Cup Doubles